{{DISPLAYTITLE:Mu2 Chamaeleontis}}

Mu2 Chamaeleontis (μ2 Cha) is a star located in the constellation Chamaeleon. It is not bright enough to be readily visible to the naked eye, having an apparent visual magnitude of 6.60, but has an absolute magnitude of 0.59. The distance to this object is approximately 556 light years, based on the star's parallax. The star's radial velocity is poorly constrained, but it appears to be drifting further away at the rate of around +3 km/s.

This object is an aging G-type giant star with a stellar classification of G6/8 III. Having exhausted the supply of hydrogen at its core, the star has cooled and expanded until now it has 11 times the girth of the Sun. It is a suspected variable star of unknown type. The star is radiating 71 times the luminosity of the Sun from its swollen photosphere at an effective temperature of 4,967 K.

References

G-type giants
Suspected variables

Chamaeleon (constellation)
Chamaeleontis, Mu2
Durchmusterung objects
088351
049326
3997